Podgorci  is a small village in the municipality of Struga, North Macedonia.

History
In 1900, Vasil Kanchov gathered and compiled statistics on demographics in the area and reported that the village of Podgorci was inhabited by about 600 Bulgarian Christians and 550 Bulgarian Muslims.

The "La Macédoine et sa Population Chrétienne" survey by Dimitar Mishev (D. Brankov) concluded that the Christian part of the local population in 1905 was composed of 288 Exarchist Bulgarians and 352 Patriarchist Bulgarians. There were Bulgarian and Serbian schools in the beginning of 20th century

Demographics
Podgorci has been inhabited by Orthodox Christian Macedonians and a Macedonian Muslim (Torbeš) population.

Population
As of the 2021 census, Podgorci had 2,430 residents with the following ethnic composition:
Turks 857
Others (including Torbeš) 642
Albanians 583
Macedonians 243
Persons for whom data are taken from administrative sources 87
Bosniaks 18

2002 Population: 2,160
 Macedonians 376
 Albanians 573
 Turks 564
 Vlachs 7
 Serbs 41
 Other 599

Languages
Languages spoken among the population of Podgorci:

 Macedonian 1995
 Albanian 89
 Turkish 22
 Bosnian 1
 Rest 53

References

External links

Villages in Struga Municipality
Macedonian Muslim villages